The following television stations broadcast on digital or analog channel 22 in Mexico:

 XEQ-TDT in Mexico City
 XHACH-TDT in Arivechi, Sonora 
 XHACZ-TDT in Acapulco, Guerrero 
 XHALM-TDT in Álamos, Sonora
 XHAN-TDT in Campeche, Campeche
 XHAPS-TDT in Agua Prieta, Sonora
 XHCDC-TDT in Ciudad del Carmen, Campeche
 XHCDI-TDT in Matehuala, San Luis Potosí 
 XHCH-TDT in Chihuahua, Chihuahua 
 XHCLP-TDT in San Luis Potosí, San Luis Potosí 
 XHCMU-TDT in Ciudad Mante, Tamaulipas
 XHCRP-TDT on Cerro Corral de Piedra, Oaxaca
 XHCTCN-TDT in Cancún, Quintana Roo
 XHCTLP-TDT in La Paz, Baja California Sur
 XHCTMD-TDT in Mérida, Yucatán
 XHCTMY-TDT in Monterrey, Nuevo León
 XHCTNY-TDT in Tepic, Nayarit
 XHCTRM-TDT in Reynosa and Matamoros, Tamaulipas
 XHCUV-TDT in Cuernavaca, Morelos
 XHCZC-TDT in Comitán de Domínguez, Chiapas
 XHDU-TDT in Zihuatanejo, Guerrero 
 XHFZC-TDT in Zacatecas, Zacatecas
 XHGUE-TDT in Guadalajara, Jalisco 
 XHGVC-TDT in Coatzacoalcos, Veracruz 
 XHGXI-TDT in Xichu, Guanajuato 
 XHHDP-TDT in Hidalgo del Parral, Chihuahua 
 XHIXM-TDT in Ixmiquilpan, Hidalgo
 XHJZA-TDT in Juchitán de Zaragoza, Oaxaca
 XHJZT-TDT in Jalpa, Zacatecas 
 XHMZI-TDT in Zitácuaro, Michoacán de Ocampo 
 XHNCZ-TDT in Nacozari, Sonora 
 XHNEA-TDT in Teotitlan de Flores Magón, Oaxaca 
 XHPAC-TDT in Parras de la Fuente, Coahuila
 XHPDT-TDT in Puerto Peñasco, Sonora
 XHPMG-TDT in La Piedad, Michoacán
 XHRCSP-TDT in Santiago Papasquiaro, Durango
 XHSDP-TDT in San Pedro Pochutla, Oaxaca 
 XHSIB-TDT in San Isidro, Baja California Sur
 XHSPM-TDT in San Pablo del Monte, Tlaxcala
 XHSPO-TDT in Torreón, Coahuila
 XHSPT-TDT in San Pedro Tapanatepec, Oaxaca 
 XHSXL-TDT in Santiago Juxtlahuaca, Oaxaca 
 XHTCA-TDT in Tecomán, Colima
 XHTUH-TDT in Tulancingo, Hidalgo
 XHTXB-TDT in Apizaco, Tlaxcala
 XHUAA-TDT in Tijuana, Baja California
 XHUAD-TDT in Durango, Durango
 XHUJZ-TDT in Huautla de Jiménez, Oaxaca
 XHVAZ-TDT in Valparaíso, Zacatecas 
 XHVEL-TDT in Cuéncame, Durango

See also
Channel 22 virtual TV stations in Mexico

22